Blastobasis tabernatella is a moth in the family Blastobasidae. It was described by Henry Legrand in 1966. It is found on the Seychelles.

References

Blastobasis
Moths described in 1966